Eugene Field School is a historic school building located at Park Hills, St. Francois County, Missouri.  It was built in 1907, and is a two-story, "T"-plan, Late Victorian style red brick school building with an addition completed by 1911.  It has a low-pitched hipped roof and sits on a raised concrete foundation.  It features arched openings and polychromatic brick detailing.

It was added to the National Register of Historic Places in 2005.

References

School buildings on the National Register of Historic Places in Missouri
Victorian architecture in Missouri
School buildings completed in 1907
Buildings and structures in St. Francois County, Missouri
National Register of Historic Places in St. Francois County, Missouri
1907 establishments in Missouri